Live at Donte's is one of four American recordings Jean-Luc Ponty made in 1969. Its original release (tracks 1–4) was on vinyl by Blue Note and reissued in 1995 by Pacific Jazz on CD with four bonus tracks (5–8). It was recorded live at Donte's in North Hollywood, California, on March 12-13 1969, and it was released in vinyl in 1981.

Track listing
 "Hypomode de Sol" (Jean-Luc Ponty) – 12:45
 "People" (Jule Styne, Bob Merrill) – 7:53
 "California" (Jean-Luc Ponty) – 9:42
 "Eighty-One" (Ron Carter) – 12:20
 "Foosh" (George Duke) – 7:54
 "Sara’s Theme" (Michel Legrand) – 3:41
 "Pamukkale" (Wolfgang Dauner) – 9:26
 "Cantaloupe Island" (Herbie Hancock) – 8:12

Personnel
 Jean-Luc Ponty – violin
 George Duke – piano
 John Heard – bass
 Al Cecchi – drums

Technical
 Richard Bock – recording engineer
 Michael Cuscuna – reissue producer
 Malcolm Addey – mastering
 Jim Marshall – photography
 Patrique Roques – design

References

External links
 

Jean-Luc Ponty albums
1969 live albums